Tommy Steenberg (born November 23, 1988 in Honolulu, Hawaii) is an American retired figure skater. He won three gold medals on the ISU Junior Grand Prix series and placed ninth at the 2008 World Junior Championships.

Tommy Steenberg is a PSA Master Rated Choreographer and Free Skating Coach. He competed internationally for Team USA for 8 years. His competitive accomplishments include: 3x Junior Grand Prix Champion, 10x national competitor (2001-2010), 3x national medalist (intermediate, novice, and junior), 2008 Regional and Sectional Champion, and 2008 Junior World top 10 finisher. He won the 2010 Young Artists Showcase Choreography Competition and guest choreographed for the Ice Theatre of NY. From 2010-2012, he performed with the George Mason University Dance Company. Tommy has been a faculty member for Audrey Weisiger’s Grassroots to Champions nationwide seminars since 2008. In 2013, he graduated from the GMU Honors College with a B.A. in Dance and B.S. in Accounting and is a CPA. He is a triple gold medalist (Moves/Freestyle ’05, Solo Free Dance ’17), CER Category A compliant, and specializes in jumps, pole harness, spins, choreography, and footwork.

Staff Accountant from 2013-2015 - Certified Public Accountant (CPA) 2015

Programs

Competitive highlights
JGP: Junior Grand Prix

References

External links

 
 

American male single skaters
Sportspeople from Honolulu
Living people
1988 births